Jelu (also Romanized as Jelū; also known as Jīlū) is a village in Chehel Shahid Rural District, in the Central District of Ramsar County, Mazandaran Province, Iran. At the 2006 census, its population was 54, in 14 families.

References 

Populated places in Ramsar County